Stenoptilodes is a genus of moths in the family Pterophoridae.

Species
Stenoptilodes antirrhina 
Stenoptilodes agricultura 
Stenoptilodes altiaustralis 
Stenoptilodes brevipennis 
Stenoptilodes debbiei 
Stenoptilodes duckworthi 
Stenoptilodes gielisi 
Stenoptilodes gilvicolor 
Stenoptilodes heppneri 
Stenoptilodes huanacoicus 
Stenoptilodes hypsipora 
Stenoptilodes juanfernandicus 
Stenoptilodes limaicus 
Stenoptilodes littoralis 
Stenoptilodes maculatus 
Stenoptilodes medius 
Stenoptilodes posticus 
Stenoptilodes sematodactyla 
Stenoptilodes sordipennis 
Stenoptilodes stigmatica 
Stenoptilodes taprobanes 
Stenoptilodes thrasydoxa 
Stenoptilodes umbrigeralis 

 
Platyptiliini
Moth genera